William "Bill" Appleton (born May 23, 1961) is an American entrepreneur and technologist best known as the programmer of the first rich media authoring tool World Builder, the multimedia programming language SuperCard, a best-selling CD-ROM Titanic: Adventure Out of Time, the DreamFactory Software REST API platform, and Snapshot Org Management for Salesforce.

Early life and background

Originally from Oak Ridge, Tennessee, Appleton graduated from Oak Ridge High School in 1979 before moving on to Davidson College, where he studied philosophy, painting and economics. In 1984 Appleton passed up an economics graduate fellowship at Vanderbilt University and moved into his parents’ basement, where he developed programs for his Macintosh computer.

Career

Appleton has designed and written more than 30 professional software publications throughout his career, including World Builder, the first-ever rich media authoring tool. Appleton also created the multimedia programming language SuperCard and developed Titanic: Adventure Out of Time, a national best-selling CD-ROM game that sold more than 5 million copies worldwide. He was the founder and Chief Technology Officer of DreamFactory Software and developed a serverless REST API platform in the enterprise space. Currently he is the Chief Technology Officer at Metazoa working on Snapshot Org Management for Salesforce.

In 1989, Appleton won the Silicon Beach Software Technical Innovation Award, presented for his work in hypermedia development environments.  Appleton owns two patents. The first, issued in 1997, covers a method for the production of digital movies. The second, issued in 1998, describes a computer display system for the real-time display of digital movie frames.

Appleton’s software applications include the following:

Silicon Beach Software
 1985, Enchanted Scepters 
 1986, World Builder 
 1988, Apache Strike
 1989, SuperCard

TeleRobotics Inc.
 1986, Course Builder 
 1987, Video Builder

Symmetry Corp 
 1988, HyperDA

Reactor
 1991, Creepy Castle

Cyberflix
 1993, Lunicus
 1994, Jump Raven
 1995, Dust: A Tale of the Wired West
 1996, Skull Cracker
 1996, Titanic: Adventure Out of Time
 1996, Timelapse
 1997, Power Rangers Zeo vs. The Machine Empire
 1998, Redjack: Revenge of the Brethren

Disney Interactive
 1997, MathQuest
 1998, The D Show
 1998, ReadingQuest
 1999, Villains’ Revenge

MessageBay
 2000, VoiceAnimation
 2001, VideoAnimator

DreamFactory Software
 2002, DreamFactory Player
 2003, SBuilder
 2005, DreamTeam
 2006, OrgView
 2006, SnapShot
 2006, Carousel
 2006, FormFactory
 2006, Web Meeting Mashup
 2008, TableTop
 2008, Monarch
 2009, GamePlan
 2010, Retail Relay
 2011, LaunchPad
 2013, DreamFactory API Platform

CyberFlix

After stints in Silicon Valley and Chicago, Appleton moved back home to Knoxville, Tennessee. From 1994 to 1998, Appleton served as founder and president of  Cyberflix Inc., a Knoxville-based multimedia computer programming company specializing in interactive movie production. While at Cyberflix, Appleton worked on the hit titles Lunicus and Jump Raven, both of which were sold to Paramount Technology Group. In a 1993 interview with the Chicago Tribune, Appleton discussed what he saw as the future of video game characters. "Great dramatic issues will be played out on CD-ROM, things that will play all of the human emotions, love hate, joy, greed, childbirth, death, promotion, firing – you name it," he was quoted as saying.

Cyberflix launched its hit title Titanic: Adventure Out of Time in November 1996. Production costs totaled $2 million, and the game retailed for $50. The Titanic title went on to sell millions of copies and become an international best-selling CD-ROM game. The game features an interactive, authentic replica of the Titanic ship that took two years of research to create digitally and included the use of the ship’s original blueprints. At the time, the Discovery Channel called it "the most historically accurate digital model of Titanic available." Titanic: Adventure Out of Time earned a MacHome Journal Home Choice Award in 1997, as well as a first place prize for best animation at the World Animation Celebration. By 1998, Cyberflix had 35 employees, and annual revenue exceeded $3 million. Throughout his career, Appleton has worked with Disney, Paramount and Viacom to create applications for content development.

DreamFactory

Appleton served as the chief technology officer of DreamFactory Software, a Campbell, California-based company he co-founded. DreamFactory builds software tools for the enterprise, originally targeting Salesforce.com users and currently developing a cloud service platform for enterprise companies to move their apps and data freely without any lock-in restrictions to any hosted cloud. Appleton is also credited with developing third-party enterprise applications for Cisco WebEx Connect, Microsoft Windows Azure and Intuit WorkPlace.

Personal life

Appleton lives in Los Gatos, California.

References 

1961 births
Living people
People from Oak Ridge, Tennessee
Davidson College alumni
American computer programmers
American video game programmers